Opegaster is a genus of trematodes in the family Opecoelidae.

Species
Opegaster acuta Manter, 1940
Opegaster alykhani Bilqees, Hadi, Khatoon, Muti-ur-Rehman, Perveen & Haseeb, 2009
Opegaster anguilli Harshey, 1933
Opegaster apogonichthydis Yamaguti, 1938
Opegaster beliyai Pande, 1937
Opegaster bothi Yamaguti, 1970
Opegaster brevifistula Ozaki, 1928
Opegaster cameroni Caballero y Caballero & Caballero Rodríguez, 1969
Opegaster caulopsettae Manter, 1954
Opegaster cryptocentri Yamaguti, 1958
Opegaster dactylopteri Yamaguti, 1970
Opegaster dendrochiri Yamaguti, 1970
Opegaster dermatogenyos Yamaguti, 1970
Opegaster ditrematis Yamaguti, 1942
Opegaster elongata Yamaguti, 1959
Opegaster gobii Yamaguti, 1952
Opegaster gonorhynchi Gavrilyuk-Tkachuk, 1979
Opegaster hawaiiensis Yamaguti, 1970
Opegaster hippocampi Shen, 1982
Opegaster iniistii Yamaguti, 1970
Opegaster lobulus Wang, 1977
Opegaster longivesicula Yamaguti, 1952
Opegaster lutiani Bravo-Hollis & Manter, 1957
Opegaster macrorchis Yamaguti, 1938
Opegaster mastacembalii Harshey, 1937
Opegaster mehrii Harshey, 1937
Opegaster oplegnathi Wang, Wang & Zhang, 1992
Opegaster ouemoensis Bray & Justine, 2013
Opegaster ovatus Ozaki, 1928
Opegaster paramacrorchis Hafeezullah, 1971
Opegaster parapristipomatis Yamaguti, 1934
Opegaster plotosi Yamaguti, 1940
Opegaster pritchardae Overstreet, 1969
Opegaster queenslandicus (Aken'Ova, 2007) Bray & Justine, 2013
Opegaster rectus Ozaki, 1928
Opegaster syngnathi Yamaguti, 1934
Opegaster synodi Manter, 1947
Opegaster tamori Yamaguti, 1938

References

Opecoelidae
Plagiorchiida genera